St. John's University School of Law is a Roman Catholic law school in Jamaica, Queens, New York, United States, affiliated with St. John's University.

The School of Law was founded in 1925, and confers Juris Doctor degrees and degrees for Master of Laws in Bankruptcy and Master of Laws in U.S. Studies. Over 15,000 St. John's Law graduates are practicing law in the United States and foreign jurisdictions. In 2019, 89% of the law school's first-time test takers passed the bar exam.

LL.M. in Bankruptcy law
St. John's University School of Law offers the only LL.M. in Bankruptcy law in the United States. The program is a 30 credit LL.M., with 6 credits devoted towards a thesis. St. John's School of Law offers over two dozen classes focusing on various issues in bankruptcy.  Required courses for the program are: Reorganization Under Chapter 11; Bankruptcy Fraud, Ethics, and Malpractice; Bankruptcy Taxation; Bankruptcy Jurisdiction; Bankruptcy Procedure; and Consumer Bankruptcy. Classes are taught by a mixture of law professors, Federal Bankruptcy Court judges, and practicing attorneys.  The St. John's LL.M. in Bankruptcy Program is fully accredited. It has been approved by the New York State Department of Education, and has received the acquiescence of the American Bar Association.

Bar passage rates
St. John's University School of Law typically ranks in the top 4 – 6 in bar exam passage for first-time test takers among the fifteen New York State law schools:

July 2004 – 87% / Overall New York State Average – 76.5% 

July 2005 – 89% (4th)    / Overall New York State Average – 75.9%

July 2006 – 91% (4th)    / Overall New York State Average 79.4% 

July 2007 – 90% (6th)    / Overall New York State Average – 79.1%

July 2008 – 91.8% (7th)  / Overall New York State Average – 83.2% 

July 2009 – 92.1% (4th)  / Overall New York State Average – 79.8%

July 2010 – 87% (6th) / Overall New York State Average – 86%

July 2011 – 88% (7th) / Overall New York State Average – 86% 

In 2013, 87.5% of the law school's first-time test takers passed the bar exam, placing the law school seventh-best among New York's 15 law schools.

July 2014 - 87% (4th) / Overall New York State Average - 83% 

July 2019 - 89% (5th)

National Ranking: for 2020, U.S. News & World Report ranked St. John's Law 74th

Employment 
According to St. John's University School of Law's official 2018 ABA-required disclosures, 82.3% of the Class of 2018 obtained full-time, long-term, JD-required employment ten months after graduation. St. John's University School of Law's Law School Transparency under-employment score is 7.1%, indicating the percentage of the Class of 2018 unemployed, pursuing an additional degree, or working in a non-professional, short-term, or part-time job ten months after graduation.

Costs
The total cost of attendance (indicating the cost of tuition, fees, and living expenses) at St. John's University School of Law for the 2014–2015 academic year is $76,614. The Law School Transparency estimated debt-financed cost of attendance for three years is $285,041.

Publications
 
 St. John's Law Review
 American Bankruptcy Institute Law Review
 Journal of Catholic Legal Studies (formerly The Catholic Lawyer]
 Journal of Civil Rights and Economic Development
 New York International Law Review
 Commercial Division Online Law Report
 N.Y. Real Property Law Journal
 Admiralty Practicum

Clinical and externship programs

Elder Law Clinic
Child Advocacy Clinic
Refugee and Immigrant Rights Clinic
Prosecution Clinic
Criminal Defense Clinic
Securities Arbitration Clinic
Bankruptcy Advocacy Clinic (NY Legal Services Bankruptcy Assistance Project)
Domestic Violence Litigation Clinic
Immigrant Tenant Advocacy Clinic
Bridge to Justice Clinic
Civil Externship Program
Criminal Justice Externship Program
Judicial Externships Program
International Human Rights Externship Program

Conrad B. Duberstein Moot Court Competition
The Conrad B. Duberstein Moot Court Competition is an annual bankruptcy moot court competition sponsored by St. John's University School of Law and the American Bankruptcy Institute (ABI).  The competition is named in memory of former Chief Judge Conrad B. Duberstein, who was a St. John's alumnus and former ABI Director.  The competition focuses on significant issues in bankruptcy practice. It is the largest single site appellate moot court competition, with approximately 60 law school teams participating.  It is also the only bankruptcy moot court competition in the nation.  Bankruptcy practitioners judge the preliminary rounds and briefs.  New York-area bankruptcy judges from around the country judge the later rounds of the competition.

St. John's Moot Court Honor Society and American Bankruptcy Institute Law Review members organize and run the competition.  Additionally, they prepare the bench memo for the judges, field ghost teams, and serve as bailiffs during the competition. The competition winners, best briefs and best advocates are recognized at an awards banquet.

Frank S. Polestino Trial Advocacy Institute (PTAI)
The Frank S. Polestino Trial Advocacy Institute is the mock trial program for St. John's University School of Law.

Mock Trial Championships:

 
2015 AAJ National Trial Competition, Regional Champions
2014 National Trial Competition, Texas Young Lawyers Association (TYLA), Region 2 Champions
2014 Quinnipiac Annual Criminal Justice Advocacy Competition, Champions
2013 National Trial Competition, Texas Young Lawyers Association (TYLA), Region 2 Champions
2012 National Trial Competition, Texas Young Lawyers Association (TYLA), Region 2 Champions
2012 AAJ National Trial Competition, Regional Champions
2011 National Trial Competition, Texas Young Lawyers Association (TYLA), Region 2 Champions
2010 Buffalo Niagara Trial Competition
2010 ABA National Criminal Justice Trial Advocacy Competition
2009 National Institute of Trial Advocacy (NITA) Tournament of Champions
2007 National Institute of Trial Advocacy (NITA) Tournament of Champions
2005 Loyola National Civil Trial Competition
2004 Georgetown National White Collar Crime Competition
2003 National Trial Competition, Texas Young Lawyers Association (TYLA)

Notable alumni

Government
 Joseph P. Addabbo, US Representative from New York (1961–1986)
 Michael Balboni, former Deputy Secretary of State, Public Safety – New York State, former NYS Senator
 Alessandra Biaggi (born 1986), New York State Senator
 Albert H. Bosch, former US Representative
 Ron Brown, former US Secretary of Commerce and Chairman of the Democratic National Committee 
 Hugh Carey, former Governor of New York
 Gregory W. Carman, former Chief Judge and Judge, US Court of International Trade; former US Representative
 William J. Casey, former Director of Central Intelligence and Chairman of the US Securities and Exchange Commission
 Alfred C. Cerullo III, former New York City Commissioner and Council Member, professional actor in theater and television
 Mario Cuomo, former Governor of New York
 George Deukmejian, former Governor of California and Attorney General
 Dominick L. DiCarlo, former US Assistant Secretary of State for International Narcotics Matters and Chief Judge of the US Court of International Trade
 Richard Donoghue, US Attorney for the Eastern District of New York.
 Alexander Farrelly, former Governor of the US Virgin Islands
 John J. Ghezzi, former NYS Secretary of State
 Frank A. Gulotta, Nassau County District Attorney and NYS Appellate Division judge
 Lester Holtzman, former US Representative and NY judge
 Charles Hynes, former District Attorney of Kings County, New York (Brooklyn)
 Melinda Katz, District Attorney of Queens, New York, former Borough President of Queens, former NYC Council member and NYS Assembly member
 Raymond W. Kelly, former New York City Police Department Commissioner
 Henry J. Latham, former US Representative
 Jack Martins, former NYS Senator
 Basil Paterson, former New York State Secretary of State and NYS Senator
 Harvey Pitt, former Chairman of US Securities and Exchange Commission
 Charles B. Rangel, US Representative
 John J. Santucci, former District Attorney of Queens
 Paul Vallone, New York City Council member

Judges
 Harold Birns, former Associate Justice, Appellate Division of the New York Supreme Court, First Judicial Department
 Carmen Beauchamp Ciparick, former Judge, New York Court of Appeals
 P. Kevin Castel, Judge, US District Court for the Southern District of New York
 Raymond J. Dearie, Judge and former Chief Judge, US District Court for the Eastern District of New York; Judge, United States Foreign Intelligence Surveillance Court
 Janet DiFiore, Chief Judge, New York Court of Appeals
 Patricia DiMango, former Justice, New York Supreme Court
 John Francis Dooling Jr., former Judge, U.S. District Court for the Eastern District of New York
 Conrad B. Duberstein, former Chief Judge of the US Bankruptcy Court for the Eastern District of New York
 Randall T. Eng, Presiding Justice, New York Supreme Court, Appellate Division
 Theodore T. Jones Jr., former Judge, New York Court of Appeals
 Guy James Mangano, former Presiding Justice of New York Supreme Court, Appellate Division
 James F. Niehoff, former Associate Justice, New York Supreme Court, Appellate Division
 Edward D. Re, former Chief Judge and Judge, US Court of International Trade
 Joanna Seybert, Judge, US District Court for the Eastern District of New York
 John E. Sprizzo, former Judge, US District Court for the Southern District of New York

Media and entertainment
 Dane Clark, actor
 Michael Tucci, actor
 Terence Winter, Emmy Award-winning screenwriter and producer of television and film

Sports
 Mickey Fisher (1904/05–1963), basketball coach
 Sam Nahem (1915–2004), Major League Baseball pitcher
 Elliot Steinmetz (born 1980), basketball coach 
 Elaine Weddington Steward, lawyer working for Major League Baseball
 Fred Thompson (1933–2019), Hall of Fame track and field coach

Other
 Anthony Bevilacqua, Roman Catholic Cardinal and Archbishop of Philadelphia, Pennsylvania
 Leonard Boudin, lawyer and civil rights activist
 Clarence Dunnaville, lawyer and civil rights activist
 Kate O'Beirne, journalist, political commentator, magazine editor
 Ian Schrager, hotelier and real estate developer
 David D. Siegel, law professor, legal scholar and commentator

See also
 Law of New York

References

External links 

Catholic law schools in the United States
Educational institutions established in 1925
Law schools in New York City
St. John's University (New York City)
1925 establishments in New York City